Emmanuel I was Patriarch of the Church of the East from 937 to 960.


Emmanuel's patriarchate 
The following account of Emmanuel's patriarchate is given by Bar Hebraeus:

After the death of the catholicus Abraham, the bishops gathered together and conspired to consecrate one of their own number catholicus, whoever it might be, rather than some outside monk.  But Abu'lhasan, the counsellor of the caliph al-Radi, sent a messenger to summon a certain Emmanuel, from the monastery of Abba Joseph in the town of Balad. The bishops, forced to waive their rights, consecrated Emmanuel at Seleucia in the year 326 [AD 937/8].  Emmanuel was famed for his chastity and continence, reverenced and feared by his people, and strikingly tall and handsome; but he was also avaricious and proud, and had a sharp tongue.  The catholicus Emmanuel fulfilled his office for twenty-three years and died on the fourth day of nisan [April] in the year 349 of the Arabs [AD 960].

Sources 
Brief accounts of Emmanuel's patriarchate are given in the Ecclesiastical Chronicle of the Jacobite writer Bar Hebraeus (floruit 1280) and in the ecclesiastical histories of the Nestorian writers Mari (twelfth-century), Amr (fourteenth-century) and Sliba (fourteenth-century).

See also
 List of patriarchs of the Church of the East

Notes

References
 Abbeloos, J. B., and Lamy, T. J., Bar Hebraeus, Chronicon Ecclesiasticum (3 vols, Paris, 1877)
 Assemani, J. A., De Catholicis seu Patriarchis Chaldaeorum et Nestorianorum (Rome, 1775)
 Brooks, E. W., Eliae Metropolitae Nisibeni Opus Chronologicum (Rome, 1910)
 Gismondi, H., Maris, Amri, et Salibae: De Patriarchis Nestorianorum Commentaria I: Amri et Salibae Textus (Rome, 1896)
 Gismondi, H., Maris, Amri, et Salibae: De Patriarchis Nestorianorum Commentaria II: Maris textus arabicus et versio Latina (Rome, 1899)

960 deaths
Patriarchs of the Church of the East
10th-century bishops of the Church of the East
Year of birth unknown
Nestorians in the Abbasid Caliphate